Tchitchao Tchalim is a Togolese barrister. He was the Togolese Minister of Justice from 2011 to 2014.

References 

Togolese judges
Barristers and advocates
Year of birth missing (living people)
Living people
21st-century Togolese people